Viilor River may refer to:
 Viilor, a tributary of the Bistrița in Gorj County, Romania
 Viilor River (Someș), in Bistrița-Năsăud County, Romania